The Telangana State Excise is the law enforcement agency for excise in the Indian state of Telangana. The department enforces laws related to liquor, narcotics, psychotropics and medicines that contain alcohol and narcotics. The department was created when the state of Telangana was formed in 2014. The first minister to take charge of this department was T Padma Rao from the Telangana Rashtra Samithi party.

Duties
The agency's duties are to:

Ensure that the excise revenue is protected and collected according to the acts and rules.
Prevent illegal production of liquor and its trafficking.
Prevent the trafficking of narcotic drugs.
Campaign against alcoholism.
Implement the Abkari policy formulated by the state government every year.

Revenue
The Excise Department is one of the major sources of revenue in the state, producing Rs 25,000 to  30,000crore per year.

References

State agencies of Telangana
State taxation in India
Specialist law enforcement agencies of India
2015 establishments in Telangana
Government agencies established in 2015